Luciano Pérez de Acevedo Amo (31 March 1943 – 8 August 2021) was a Spanish politician and lawyer.

Biography
Acevedo was the son of lawyer Luciano Pérez de Acevedo Ortega, who served as Secretary-General of Diputación de Badajoz from 1941 to 1973. Born in Badajoz, he moved to Madrid, where he earned a law degree from the Complutense University of Madrid. He began practicing law in 1965, working in one of the most prestigious law firms in Extremadura. He was married and had four children.

In 1974, Acevedo entered politics, co-founding the Sociedad de Estudios Libra, which was the predecessor of the Federation of Democratic and Liberal Parties. He then joined the Union of the Democratic Centre (UCD), participating in the party's first democratic election. He then joined the People's Alliance and served in the Assembly of Extremadura from 1983 to 1987.

Luciano Pérez de Acevedo died in Badajoz on 8 August 2021 at the age of 78.

References

1943 births
2021 deaths
20th-century Spanish politicians
Union of the Democratic Centre (Spain) politicians
People's Alliance (Spain) politicians
Members of the 1st Assembly of Extremadura
Provincial Deputation Presidents of Spain
Complutense University of Madrid alumni
People from Badajoz
20th-century Spanish lawyers